The Federal center for dual-use technologies "Soyuz" (before: Lyubertsy Soyuz Science Production Association) is a research, development and production facility for both double-base and composite solid propellant rockets. It is based in Dzerzhinsk, Russia.

The Lyubertsy Soyuz Science and Production Association (LNPO Soyuz) is located near the site of the historic Nikolo-Ugreshkiy Monastery in the small city of Dzerzhinsk southeast of the Moscow Ring Road. In addition to offering solid rocket motors for civilian applications, LNPO Soyuz is commercially expanding based on its solid rocket propellant technology and a large variety of polymer products.

References

External links
 Official website

Rocket engine manufacturers of Russia
Companies based in Moscow Oblast
Federal State Unitary Enterprises of Russia
Ministry of the Defense Industry (Soviet Union)
Aerospace companies of the Soviet Union
Engine manufacturers of the Soviet Union
Research institutes in the Soviet Union